Bridgette Allen is a New Zealand-born jazz singer who has a career going back to the 1960s. She has appeared on television in both New Zealand and Australia. She also starred in the film Hooks and Feelers, which was an adaptation of a Keri Hulme story.

Background
Allen was born in New Zealand, and is of Maori descent. She is also the cousin of the singer Abe Phillips who died in 1971.

Career
By April 1970, and with no major plans to return to Australia, Allen was now based in Auckland.
In 1971, having already worked in Bangkok, by late February she was in Tahiti. There were plans for her undertake an Australian tour, which she would co-compere with Howard Morrison to promote tourism.
In May, due to commitments in New Zealand, Allen turned down a contract as a supporting artist for Morrison in Honolulu. It was reported in the 11 July issue of The Sunday News, that she was to stand in for Paul Fisher while he went with Ray Woolf to the United States, taking two months off of an eight month contract. In April 1973, it was announced in the Sunday Herald that Allen was off to the United States as guest of Carmen McRae. She was also going to look at the possibilities or work over there.

Mid 70s onwards
In June 1975, she embarked on a cabaret tour which would  include Australia, the Philippines and the possibly other locations such as Singapore. In 1976, in spite of her comments the previous year that the club circuit was "pretty dead", and television work limited to Australian artists, in May, that year she was off to Australia to carry on with her career there.

1980s
In 1981, The New Zealand Listener featured an article on her life and career in its 14 February issue.
By September 1982, following the birth of her son, she had slowed her career down. By early 1987, she was based in Melbourne.

Discography

Filmography

References

External links
 Website
 Artisttrove: Bridget Allen

New Zealand Māori women singers
New Zealand jazz singers
New Zealand expatriates in Australia
New Zealand film actresses
New Zealand musical theatre actresses
New Zealand stage actresses
20th-century New Zealand women singers
Living people
Year of birth missing (living people)